Hy-Red Gasoline Station, also known as the Hy-Red Gulf Filling Station, is a historic filling station located at Greentown, Howard County, Indiana.  It was built in 1930, and consists of two sections.  They are a projecting canopy or porte cochere with a steeply pitched roof supported by four pillars and a one-story small office building.  Both sections include multi-colored brown and beige glazed brick.  From 1939 to about 1958 it operated as a Gulf Oil filling station and thereafter housed a number of commercial enterprises including a Hickory Farms cheese shop.

It was listed on the National Register of Historic Places in 1983.

References

Gas stations on the National Register of Historic Places in Indiana
Transportation buildings and structures on the National Register of Historic Places in Indiana
Commercial buildings completed in 1930
Transportation buildings and structures in Howard County, Indiana
National Register of Historic Places in Howard County, Indiana
Gulf Oil